Jozef Kovalík was the defending champion but lost in the quarterfinals to Carlos Taberner.

Pedro Sousa won the title after defeating Taberner 6–0, 5–7, 6–2 in the final.

Seeds

Draw

Finals

Top half

Bottom half

References

External links
Main draw
Qualifying draw

Maia Challenger - Singles